Nina Vasilyevna Pereverzeva (8 March 1929 – 1 April 2022) was a Soviet and Russian politician and farmer. A member of the Communist Party of the Soviet Union, she served on its Central Committee from 1982 to 1990. She died on 1 April 2022, at the age of 93.

Awards
Order of the Red Banner of Labour (1972)
Hero of Socialist Labour (1973)
Two Orders of Lenin (1973, 1976)
Order of the October Revolution (1976)
USSR State Prize (1977)

References

1929 births
2022 deaths
People from Rostov Oblast
Central Committee of the Communist Party of the Soviet Union candidate members
Central Committee of the Communist Party of the Soviet Union members
Communist Party of the Soviet Union members
Heroes of Socialist Labour
Recipients of the Order of Lenin
Recipients of the Order of the Red Banner of Labour
Recipients of the USSR State Prize
Russian politicians
Soviet politicians
Soviet women in politics